Estimation is the process of finding a usable approximation of a result.

Estimation may also refer to:
Estimation theory, a field in statistics, also used in signal processing
Estimation statistics, a data analysis approach in frequentist statistics
Estimation (project management)
Approximation, finding estimates in the form of upper or lower bounds for a quantity that cannot readily be evaluated precisely
Forecasting
Prediction

See also
Guesstimate, an informal estimate when little information is available